Thitu Island, also known as Pag-asa Island (Hokkien ; Mandarin), having an area of , is the second largest of the naturally occurring Spratly Islands and the largest of the Philippine-administered islands. Its neighbors are the North Danger Reef to the north, Subi Reef to the west, and the Loaita and Tizard Banks to the south.

As the poblacion (administrative center) of the Kalayaan municipality of Palawan province in the Philippines, it also administers nearly a dozen other islets, cays and reefs in the Spratly Islands. Vietnam also claims the island.

In 2019–20, the island's naval port and civilian-military airstrip were upgraded despite being swarmed by Chinese vessels. Pag-asa Island has a naval jetty and landing ramp, dual use military and civilian airstrip, a lighthouse, a 5-bed lying-in clinic, a communication tower powered by Smart, and a small integrated elementary and high school.

While most of the occupants of the structures in the Spratly Islands have military personnel or temporary tourists, Pag-asa Island is the only one with a permanent civilian settlement.

Etymology 

The Filipino (Tagalog) name of the island is Pag-asa ("Hope"). It is also variously called in the following languages, ; Mandarin ; ; ; Hokkien .

Hokkien Chinese fishermen historically called the island Thih-tu (in Hokkien Min Nan pronounced ). It is sometimes incorrectly referred to as "Tiezhi Island" from the Mandarin reading;  refers to another area 7.5 km northeast of this island. The modern Mandarin Chinese name of the island was taken from one of the battleships named Chung-yeh, sent by the Chinese government during the Republic of China era to regain control of the island in 1946.

History

Early and colonial history 
There are historical records of the island having been inhabited, at various times in history, by fishermen from Champa in present-day Vietnam and the Chinese, and during the Second World War by French Indochina and Imperial Japanese troops.

In June 1763, the British ship Earl Temple sank on the reefs of Pag-asa Island en route to Manila. Three crewmembers survived for months on the island, built a raft, and used bird feathers to make a sail.  The castaways were able to reach Vietnam, later China, and from there return to England. In 1997 the shipwreck of the Earl Temple was discovered by Philippine authorities, and artifacts were recovered and are now displayed at the National Museum of the Philippines.

From 1930 to 1933, the French colonial government in French Indochina sent naval troops to the Spratlys, including Pag-asa Island. On 21 December 1933, Gouverneur M. J. Krautheimer in Cochinchina (now Vietnam) decided to annex the Spratlys to Bà Rịa Province.

Post-World War 2 history

Occupation and establishment of civilian administration by the Republic of China 
After Japan surrendered to the Allies on August 15, 1945, Republic of China officials responsible for reclaiming the South China Sea Islands embarked to recover the island. The Ministry of the Interior re-erected national markers on the major islands, drew up detailed maps of them, renamed them, and published the Location Map of the South China Sea Island.

In May 1956, Tomás Cloma, a Philippine national, landed on several of the islands, claiming that he had discovered them and enjoyed the rights associated with discovery-occupation. The ROC ambassador to the Philippines immediately issued a statement stressing that the islands were ROC territory, and sent a letter of protest to Philippine Vice President and Foreign Secretary Carlos Polestico Garcia. The Philippine government stated that these were individual actions by Cloma and had nothing to do with the Philippine government.

On October 1, 1956, at Bei Zi Reef in the South China Sea (called North Danger Reef in ), two nationalist Chinese ships (called Taiwanese ships in )- namely, the Ning Yuan (寧遠) flotilla of the Republic of China Navy (ROC), containing ROC naval vessels Taihe and Yongshun - approached Cloma's expedition with the boat PMI-IV  "and invited Captain Cloma (and Chief Engineer Benito Danseco, and other crew members) and aboard (the naval vessel Tai He ) for a conference. A 4-hour  discussion over ownership ensued, during which Cloma was below deck, unaware that a boarding party had searched his vessel and confiscated all arms/ammunition, maps and documents. Captain Cloma protested but was treated discourteously, interrogated, and kept under detention until allowed to rejoin his boat. The next day he was again invited aboard the Chinese ship. There, even under threat to their lives, Cloma and his officers refused to recognize that Freedomland was Chinese territory and to sign a statement (signed under duress, according to Filemon Cloma's son ) that they would leave Freedomland and never come back. Cloma was forced to surrender arms for which he was given a receipt, whereupon the Chinese ship left Ciriaco. Captain Cloma found that the houses on Ciriaco and Irenea had been removed, and the buildings on Abad Santos Island burned down." (Quotation marks directly above indicated heavy paraphrasing from.)

After the Chinese government's building burning and confiscation of property, Tomas and Filemon Cloma agitated for the Government of the Philippines to support their claims to Freedomland.

On 22 May 1963, the Republic of Vietnam Navy a sovereignty stele on Thitu Island by crew members of the three vessels Huong Giang, Chi Lang and Ky Hoa of the South Vietnam.

Seizure by the Philippines from the Republic of China 

On 18 April 1971, due to a strong typhoon hitting Pag-asa Island (Zhongye Island), the Republic of China (Taiwan) authorities ordered all the garrisons on Zhongye Island to withdraw to Taiping Island to avoid typhoons. However, after the typhoon, the Taiwan side changed its defense, transferred the original troops back to Taiwan, and then used the landing ship to transport new troops to Zhongye Island. The Philippines saw this empty space and organized the troops to land on the island occupied by Taiwan on 29 July and renamed the island "Pag-asa Island". According to the 155th page of the second episode of "The Land Salary" published by the Taiwan Marine Corps Command, the Taiwan Navy detachment that arrived at Zhongye Island on the same day found that the Philippine Marine Corps was on the island, and Captain Hao Deyun immediately ordered the command. The 76mm gun was ready to be fired. The Philippine army on the island is a huge threat to Taiwanese forces, as a result they suddenly received an order from above: no challenge, the troops changed to Taiping Island. These Taiwanese Kuomintang officers and men had to watch the Zhongye Island fall back into the hands of the Philippines.

The Philippines formally established the municipality of Kalayaan on Pag-asa island on 11 June 1978, by virtue of Presidential Decree 1596 series of 1978.

Post-PCA decision 
Seven new buildings were constructed on Thitu Island in 2017.

In 2018, the Philippine Coast Guard constructed 5 lighthouses in the area, and this includes one on Thitu Island.

In 2018–19, the Philippines started to built a beach ramp, enabling the delivery of construction equipment for to work on the construction, rehabilitation and repairs of the Rancudo Airfield airstrip, soldiers' barracks, conventional and renewable power generators, desalination facilities, lighthouses, sewage disposal system, shelters and storage facilities for civilian fishermen.

By May 2020, the beaching ramp was completed and Filipino Naval ship BRP Ivatan landed on the ramp. Work on the port and upgrades to the island's airstrip progressed.

On 9 June 2020, the Philippine Department of National Defense (DND) led the inauguration of a beaching ramp on Thitu Island which was finally completed after three years. The facility enabled to bring in more materials and equipment to repair and maintain the airstrip and building of other facilities. Also, the Department of Transportation (DOTR) confirmed that the new seaport and sheltered port on Thitu Island is completed and ready to operate by 12 June. In June 2020, the Philippines reversed its decision to suspend the Philippines–United States Visiting Forces Agreement, and completed construction of access ramp on Thitu Island, which will enable the Philippines to commence repair to the airbase runway. China has been asked by the Philippines to respect the Permanent Court of Arbitration, which rejected China's claims in the South China Sea.

In August 2020, the Kalayaan municipal government named six sandbars and two reefs associated with Pag-asa Island.

On 12 June 2021, the National Power Corporation switched on its ₱33 million Kalayaan Diesel Power Plant project that covered the supply, delivery and installation of the 300 kilowatt diesel generating sets, a 13.8-kilovolt (kV) distribution line and fuel oil storage tanks, providing round-the-clock power to the facilities on the island.

Topography 
Pag-asa Island is a low-lying island with trees, shrubs, and sand bars. It is surrounded by coral reefs populated with rusting shipwrecks visible above water.

Civilian administration 
The island serves as the town proper to the municipality of Kalayaan. Only Pag-asa Island, among all Philippine-occupied Spratly islands, is currently inhabited by Filipino civilians. The civilian population of about 300, which includes children, were introduced in 2001. However, fewer than 200 civilian Filipinos are present on the island at a time. They live in a few dozen houses, linked with sandy paths. It administers nearly dozen other islets, cays, and reefs in the Spratly Islands. It is the only Philippine-occupied island in the Spratlys to have a significant number of structures, including a municipal hall, multi-purpose hall, health center, school, police station, coast guard station, marine  research station, water-filtration plant, engineering building, marina, communication tower, and military barracks. The residents raise pigs, goats, and chickens, and plant crops in an allotted space to supplement their supplies of goods provided by a naval vessel which visits once a month. By day, the residents get electricity from a power generator owned by the municipality. By night, they shift to stored solar power that comes from 1.5-volt solar panels installed on the island. The houses do not have running water – water is used from tanks in front of each house. A diesel power plant was activated on 12 June 2021, providing full power from day to night.

In April 2021, the Department of Information and Communications Technology announced the installation of free Wi-Fi facilities at Pag-asa Island Elementary School, Barangay Hall, and other sites on the island. This has allowed children on the island to continue with their distance learning.

The Philippine Coast Guard plans to upgrade its coast guard station on Pag-asa Island to boost monitoring of incursions and maritime safety and search and rescue.

Military 
The island has been occupied and administered by the Philippines since 1971.

Being the second largest of the Spratly Islands, It is tightly protected by the Philippine forces. The island's beaches have unused concrete bunkers which were built in the 1970s, a few years after the Philippine military base was established. Two-thirds of the Philippine military stationed in Philippine-occupied islands (i.e. 40 out of 60 soldiers) are assigned to the island.

Rancudo Airfield 

Rancudo Airfield, named after the former Philippine Air Force Commanding General, Jose L. Rancudo, is a military and civilian airfield which was built in 1978 and has a  unpaved airstrip. It is currently operating on just  because both ends of the runway have been eroded by the sea. Repairs, initially set to begin by 2018, have been delayed.

Naval Station Emilio Liwanag 
Naval Station Emilio Liwanag (formerly called as Naval Station Pag-Asa) is the naval base of the Philippine Navy within Kalayaan, Palawan. It was renamed on 7 July 2009, in honor of Emilio S. Liwanag, a retired World War II and Korean War veteran. In 2004, the Philippine Navy's BRP Lanao del Norte (LT-504) ran aground during a failed attempt to dock near the island. The damaged ship remains at the site of the wreck. Additionally, the Philippine Navy has since then built a naval base be built on the island, specifically for the purposes of training the Philippine Navy's elite Special Warfare Group or Navy Seals.

Development plans 
The Philippine Navy has since 1999 proposed to create a long causeway leading to a deep-water region.  This has already been completed as of June 2020, paving the way for Philippine Navy ships and contractors to proceed with the landing of equipment for the improvement of the facilities of the island.

The island has a white sand coastline, is filled with trees, and is a sanctuary of several species of sea birds. Its wide coral base makes for good diving. Senator Sonny Angara filed a bill on 27 August 2016, that aims to promote the island as an ecotourism zone.  If such proposal will be enacted to a law, other islands controlled by the Philippines would also be declared as protected areas under the National Integrated Protected Areas System (NIPAS).

In 2017, approximately 1.6 billion pesos was allocated to the island's development, for projects including a desalination plant, a port, and runway repairs. Newly repaired naval and air ports will enable the delivery of construction materials and essential supplies to improve living conditions, and construction of desalination plant, renewable energy power source, cold storage facility, and fish port. A beaching ramp and sheltered port were inaugurated in 2020. Runway repairs are set to begin by mid-2021.

The Philippine government plans to turn the island into a logistics hub to sustain the country's military forces in the area.

See also 
 Kalayaan, Palawan
 Territorial disputes in the South China Sea
 China containment policy
 Dongsha Island Airport (Pratas Island)
 Yongxing Island Airport (Woody Island in the Paracel Islands)
 List of airports in the Spratly Islands
 List of maritime features in the Spratly Islands
 Taiping Island Airport
 Layang-Layang Airport

References

External links

Asia Maritime Transparency Initiative Island Tracker

Islands of the Spratly Islands
Kalayaan, Palawan
Thitu Reefs